The Instituto Valencia of Don Juan (Spanish: Instituto Valencia de Don Juan) is located in Madrid, Spain. It was declared Bien de Interés Cultural in 1981.

References 

Buildings and structures in Almagro neighborhood, Madrid
Bien de Interés Cultural landmarks in Madrid